During the 2001–02 English football season, Everton competed in the FA Premier League.

Season summary
In what had become a depressingly familiar pattern for the Goodison Park faithful, the 2001-02 season saw encouraging form only on, followed by a disastrous run of results after Christmas Day, plunging the Toffees deep into relegation trouble. The Everton directors finally lost patience with Walter Smith when they sacked him on 13 March, after being knocked out by Middlesbrough in the FA Cup quarter final, with only one win in 13 league games which left Everton one point above the relegation zone. Former Preston and future Manchester United boss David Moyes was named as his successor, and did a good job of steering Everton clear of the drop zone – though they finished 15th in the table.

Kit
Everton retained the previous season's home kit, manufactured by Puma and sponsored by one2one. The away kit was Silver and the third kit was pink with black sleeves. Both away and third kits had black shorts.

Final league table

Results summary

Results by round

Results
Everton's score comes first

Legend

FA Premier League

FA Cup

League Cup

Squad

Left club during season

Reserve squad

Transfers

In

Out

Transfers in:  £8,900,000
Transfers out:  £7,925,000
Total spending:  £975,000

Statistics

Starting 11
Considering starts in all competitions
 GK: #13,  Steve Simonsen, 25
 RB: #2,  Steve Watson, 24
 CB: #5,  David Weir, 36
 CB: #4,  Alan Stubbs, 29
 LB: #3,  Alessandro Pistone, 25
 RM: #7,  Niclas Alexandersson, 28
 CM: #17,  Scot Gemmill, 31
 CM: #16,  Thomas Gravesen, 22
 LM: #6,  David Unsworth, 28
 CF: #8,  Tomasz Radzinski, 23
 CF: #9,  Kevin Campbell, 21

References

Everton
Everton F.C. seasons